Tony Stamas (born 1966) was an American politician from Michigan. Stamas was a member of Michigan House of Representatives and a state senator.

Early life 
On April 9, 1966, Stamas was born in Midland, Michigan.

Education 
In 1988, Stamas earned a bachelor's degree in communications from Michigan State University.

Career 
Since 1998, Stamas was a Republican member of Michigan House of Representatives. In 2002, Stamas was elected to the state senate.

Personal life 
Stamas' wife is Sara Stamas. They live in Midland, Michigan. They have two children, including an adopted daughter, Sophia Jiuxin Stamas. Stamas is a Lutheran.

References

External links 
 Tony Stamas at ballotpedia.org
 Tony Stamas at mlive.com

1966 births
Michigan State University alumni
Michigan state senators
Members of the Michigan House of Representatives
American Lutherans
Living people
People from Midland, Michigan
20th-century American politicians
21st-century American politicians